The Depretis IV government of Italy held office from 29 May 1881 until 25 May 1883, a total of 726 days, or 1 year, 11 months and 26 days.

Government parties
The government was composed by the following parties:

Composition

References

Italian governments
1881 establishments in Italy